The men's singles squash  competition at the 2017 World Games took place from 25 to 28 July 2017 at the Hasta La Vista Squash Center in Wrocław, Poland.

Seeds

Results

References 
 https://www.theworldgames.org/editions/Wroclaw-POL-2017-4/infosystem

Men
Squash records and statistics